Pars Khazar is an Iranian small appliance manufacturer in Rasht.

History
The company was founded in November 1982 as a small industrial parts manufacturing workshop. Historically a major producer of portable heaters and air conditioners, the company has expanded to include nearly every category of small domestic appliances in the food preparation and cooking, as well as household cleaning and ironing.

References

External links 
 

Manufacturing companies established in 1982
Iranian brands
Manufacturing companies of Iran
Home appliance brands
Home appliance manufacturers of Iran
Engine manufacturers of Iran